Aleš Hojs (born 12 December 1961) is a Slovenian politician, who most recently served as the Minister of the Interior in 14th Government of Slovenia from March 2020 to June 2022. Prior to this, he served as the Minister of Defence from February 2012 to March 2013.

He was born in 1961 in Ljubljana, PR Slovenia, FPR Yugoslavia. He attended the Bežigrad Grammar School and graduated at the Faculty of Architecture in Ljubljana in 1988.

References 

1961 births
Living people
Place of birth missing (living people)
21st-century Slovenian politicians
Defence ministers of Slovenia
Interior ministers of Slovenia